The Centre Party, or the Centre Reform Group, and occasionally referred to as the Centre Movement, was a short-lived extreme-right political party that operated in the Australian state of New South Wales. Founded in December 1933, the party's leader and most prominent figure was Eric Campbell, the leader of the paramilitary New Guard movement. That organisation had been established to oppose what its members perceived as the socialist tendencies of Jack Lang, the Premier of New South Wales, but declined following Lang's dismissal in early 1932. The party, unlike most fascist-oriented parties in Europe, acted as a wing of its more prominent paramilitary arm.

The Centre Party contested five seats at the 1935 state election, and its candidates placed second to the United Australia Party (UAP) in two electorates, with almost 20% of the vote. However, it polled poorly in the other seats it contested, and disbanded shortly after the election. The Centre Party is generally seen as the political extension of the remnant of the New Guard, which had decreased in popularity and influence, and, under Campbell's leadership, had become increasingly inclined towards fascism.

History

Background and formation

With Eric Campbell, a solicitor and former officer in the Australian Imperial Force (AIF), as "principal founder", the New Guard was established in February 1931, open to "all loyal citizens irrespective of creed, party, social or financial position". Campbell's new organisation sprang out of the Old Guard, a "secretive" group of Sydney-based businessmen formed to oppose Jack Lang, the Premier of New South Wales and the leader of the Labor Party, which had gained power at the October 1930 state election. At the height of its power, the movement had been "overwhelmingly a middle-class organisation", and was, in general, "virulently opposed by workers and trade unions", with the exception of the Railway Service Association and other right-wing unions. Its main goal was achieved in early May 1932, when Lang's government was dismissed by Sir Philip Game, the Governor of New South Wales. Lang had refused to pay interest on loans from overseas creditors, and withdrew government money from bank accounts to prevent the federal government from appropriating it for that purpose. He was replaced as premier by Bertram Stevens, who led a coalition of the conservative United Australia Party and United Country Party to a landslide victory at the subsequent June 1932 state election. The anti-Labor parties together gained 31 seats and won just under half of the popular vote.

The New Guard and other radical groups "lost much of their motivation" following the defeat of Lang at the 1932 election, with the New Guard confronted with an "unmistakable decline in membership" following Lang's dismissal. In late 1932, Campbell had begun to outline more fully his political beliefs, producing a series of broadcasts in which he develop a "complete credo for a fascist State", most notably incorporating a "non-elective cabinet or commission, a corporative assembly, vocational franchise and a charter of liberty". He also stated his intentions to contest the next state election, a date for which had not yet been set. In early 1933, Campbell toured Europe, meeting with Sir Oswald Mosley, the leader of the British Union of Fascists, and also with German and Italian leaders. However, on his return to Australia, Campbell's support for an "openly pro-fascist policy" was met with strong opposition from the Guard's "anti-fascist moderates". These attempts to "establish the movement as Australia's first fascist party" are thought to have "hastened the New Guard's decline", with many previous members "disinclined to accept what was in fact the movement's true character".

The Centre Party was formally established on 4 December 1933 at a meeting, described as having “over 1,000 people” in attendance. The Sydney Morning Herald reported that “100 branches” of the party would be established. The “majority of the diminishing movement” endorsed its move into electoral politics, which was, according to Campbell, “necessitated by the failure of the UAP governments, at both federal and state levels, to accede to the New Guard's demands”. 
 

The party did not contest the September 1934 federal election, as there was “not time to organise it”. An August 1934 meeting of the New Guard reaffirmed Campbell as leader, and resolved to “make itself felt in the next state elections”.

1935 election and aftermath

At the May 1935 New South Wales state election, the Centre Party contested five out of the 90 Legislative Assembly districts, all in suburban Sydney, and polled 0.60 percent of the total vote. In two seats, Hornsby, contested by Fergus Munro, and Lane Cove, contested by Campbell, only the Centre Party and the United Australia Party fielded candidates, with the former polling over 15 percent of the vote in both seats. In the other seats it contested, the Centre Party candidates failed to poll more than 5 percent of the vote. The party's relatively high vote in Hornsby and Lane Cove is thought to have represented "merely the level of protest against [UAP Premier] Stevens" in the absence of other candidates.

In Arncliffe, the only seat that required a preference distribution, the majority (56.78%) of Centre Party preferences flowed to the United Australia candidate, Horace Harper, who was defeated by Labor's Joseph Cahill, a future premier. Enoch Jones, the candidate for Arncliffe, later served as a City of Rockdale councillor, and contested the seat of Rockdale for the Liberal Democrats at the 1944 state election. Additionally, Aubrey Murphy, the candidate in Concord, served on two occasions as mayor of the Blue Mountains City Council in the 1950s, and was named an MBE in the 1960 New Year Honours.

With the exception of occasional speaking engagements, Campbell himself largely withdrew from public life following the election, and spent most of the rest of his life in country New South Wales, where he was president of the Burrangong Shire Council in 1949 and 1950 (now part of Young Shire). Campbell's 1965 autobiographical account of his involvement in the New Guard, The Rallying Point, does not mention the Centre Party at all. Later writers have suggested that the party's lack of success at the 1935 election represented "an electoral brick-wall", with the party overall a "failure" and Campbell's movement having "lost most of its drive".

Policies
At a gathering at the Presbyterian Assembly Hall in late February 1934, Campbell expounded fourteen "guiding principles" of the Centre Party, in order:

Analysis
In one of its first reports on the party, The Sydney Morning Herald wrote that the Centre Party would be "a distinct organisation from the New Guard", although with the New Guard's "backing". Later writers have generally viewed the party as simply the New Guard's political manifestation, representing "the culmination of the New Guard’s ideological evolution". Rodney Smith categorises the Centre Party with several other parties in the 1920s and 1930s that were attempting to "claim the centre ground" between the Labor parties (the ALP and Lang Labor) and the anti-Labor parties (the Nationalists and then the UAP). These other parties included the Australian Party (established by former prime minister Billy Hughes) and the All for Australia League, and had little in common other than being "anti-political", often deriving from "the clashing of factions within the major parties", and not representing "any kind of long-term challenge" to the party system. John McCarthy suggests Campbell's attempts to promote the party as centrist were a result of the "complete marginalisation of the far right" at the preceding 1932 state election. However, despite Campbell's appeal to the middle-class, Keith Amos notes the party was "almost completely disregarded by the popular press", with "public interest in right-wing militancy" evaporating.

Other authors have debated the extent to which the Centre Party was fascist. Matthew Cunningham describes the functions of the New Guard and Centre Party as "twofold": to "augment constitutional government as a physical bulwark against communism", and to "act as a moral force championing the tenets of individualism that had been inherited from Britain". However, he also notes that Campbell "clearly identified as a fascist, despite his later claims to the contrary". Amos writes that the New Guard "unequivocally stamped itself as a fascist organization, the first such movement in Australia to achieve this distinction".

See also
 Australia First Movement
 Far-right politics in Australia
 List of political parties in Australia
 New Party
 New Guard

Notes

References

Sources

 
 
 
 
 
 
 

1930s in Australia
1933 establishments in Australia
1933 disestablishments in Australia
White nationalism in Australia
Defunct far right political parties in Australia
Defunct political parties in New South Wales
Fascist parties
History of New South Wales
Third Position